The University of Texas Rio Grande Valley (UTRGV) is a public research university with multiple campuses throughout  the Rio Grande Valley region of Texas and is the southernmost member of the University of Texas System.

In 2019 The University of Texas Rio Grande Valley enrolled in the fall 29,619 students, making the public university the ninth-largest university in the state of Texas and the fourth largest (student enrollment) academic institution in The University of Texas system. In 2018, UTRGV is also one of the largest universities in the U.S. to have a majority Hispanic student population; 89.2% of its students are Hispanic, virtually all of them Mexican Americans. It was classified in 2020 among "R2: Doctoral Universities – High research activity".

History

On December 6, 2012, the University of Texas System Board of Regents approved a proposal to merge, eliminating both The University of Texas–Pan American and The University of Texas at Brownsville/Texas Southmost College, and create The University of Texas Rio Grande Valley in their place. The new institution was planned to include a medical school and have access to the Texas Permanent University Fund (PUF). Texas Governor Rick Perry signed SB 24 into law, approving the creation of the new university in June 2013. In December 2013, the UT System Board of Regents voted to name the new institution The University of Texas Rio Grande Valley (UTRGV).

Dr. Guy Bailey was selected as the founding university president.  Dr. Bailey, in turn, selected Dr. Havidan Rodriguez as the founding Provost and Executive Vice President for Academic Affairs (EVPAA), and Dr. Janna Arney as Deputy President. In late August 2017, Dr. Havidan Rodriguez resigned his position as Provost/EVPAA to become the 20th President of The University at Albany, SUNY. After his resignation was approved, Dr. Bailey appointed Dr. Patricia Alvarez McHatton as the interim provost and vice president for academic affairs.

In November 2014, the UT System Board of Regents approved the "Vaqueros" as the athletic nickname for University of Texas Rio Grande Valley. They also approved the official colors of blue, green, and orange.

The university officially opened on August 31, 2015, with UT System chancellor Bill McRaven, U.S. Representative Rubén Hinojosa and Texas State Senator Juan "Chuy" Hinojosa  attending the flag-raising ceremony. McRaven said, "One hundred years from now, Texas will look back and say that this day changed Texas forever."

To honor the largest donation in the history of higher education in the Rio Grande Valley, the College of Business and Entrepreneurship was named Robert C. Vackar College of Business and Entrepreneurship. Robert C. Vackar, CEO of Bert Ogden Auto Group donated $15 million in the form of an endowment to the college.

Campuses and buildings 
The university's property totals 550 acres. UTRGV owns 105 buildings; some of the properties include:
 Brownsville, Texas
 The Brownsville Campus (REGIONAL)
 Casa Bella
 Cueto House
 Lucerna House
 Resaca Plaza
 Vaquero Plaza
 Stargate
 Edinburg, Texas
 The Edinburg Campus (MAIN CAMPUS)
 Alumni Center
 Community Engagement and Student Success Building
 Visual Arts Building
 Advanced Tooling Engineering Center
 McAllen, Texas
 McAllen Teaching Site
 Harlingen, Texas
 Academic and Clinical Research Building
 Pump House
 Clinical Education Building
 Rio Grande City, Texas
 UTRGV at Starr County
 South Padre Island, Texas
 Coastal Studies Lab

Students and employees with dependent children may live in the Village Apartments in the Edinburg Campus or the Casa Bella Apartments in the Brownsville campus. The Village Apartments is zoned to: the following Edinburg CISD schools: De La Viña Elementary School, B. L. Garza Middle School, Edinburg North High School.

Academics

Rankings

UTRGV offers 64 bachelor's, 49 master's, and 4 doctoral programs (in addition to 2 cooperative doctoral programs). For the Academic Year 2015–2016, 92.7% of enrolled students came from the Cameron, Hidalgo, Starr, and Willacy counties. The ethnic enrollment is 89.2% Hispanic (Fall 2017).

In 2017, The Hispanic Outlook in Higher Education Magazine has ranked UTRGV 3rd in the country in awarding bachelor's degrees to Hispanic students.

Financial aid
In 2017, The University of Texas Rio Grande Valley was ranked No. 6 (out of 56 Texas Universities) for lowest student loan debt in the state of Texas.

Colleges and schools
Eleven colleges and schools formed the academic foundation for UTRGV, including:

Academic accreditation 
UTRGV inherited the academic accreditation of its legacy institutions. The university is fully accredited by the Southern Association of Colleges and Schools.

UTRGV was notified on December 6, 2016 that it was being placed on a 12-month probation by the Southern Association of Colleges and Schools Commission on Colleges (SACSCOC). The reason why UTRGV was placed on probation because of the complexity of a transition that involved the separation of UTB/TSC, the separate accreditation of TSC, and the formation of UTRGV. UTRGV will learn of the probation-removal decision by the SACSCOC Board of Trustees in December 2017. The SACSCOC Board of Trustees on December 11 announced it removed The University of Texas Rio Grande Valley from probationary status. The decision by the board to remove UTRGV from probationary status was based on the university successfully addressing the Statewide Single Audit for FY 2017 conducted by the Texas State Auditor's Office.

The UTRGV School of Medicine received preliminary accreditation from the Liaison Committee on Medical Education in October 2016. In May 2016, the School of Medicine received accreditation from the Accreditation Council for Graduate Medical Education (ACGME) to offer a medical residency program in psychiatry.

Proposed expansions

Legislation to establish a law school in UTRGV was introduced by representative Eddie Lucio III in November 2014 but did not pass in the Texas Senate. On May 21, 2019, the Texas House of Representatives approved House Bill 103 during the 86th Legislative Session, whose author was Representative Armando Martinez, that calls for the establishment of a public law school in the Rio Grande Valley.

Student life

Prior to the 2008 U.S. Presidential Election, on February 22, 2008, then-Senator Barack Obama visited the UTRGV Edinburg Campus (then known as the University of Texas-Pan American) to talk to college students about better paying jobs and tuition assistance.

Athletics

The merged university inherited UTPA's Division I membership; most of the athletic facilities are located in Edinburg. They have membership with the Western Athletic Conference.

On November 19, 2016, the UTRGV Women's Volleyball Team defeated the Utah Valley Women's Volleyball team, making them the Western Athletic Conference (WAC) Volleyball Champions of 2016.

Mascot
The choice of a new university nickname was met with some contention from members of the communities of the two merged schools. UTPA supporters, the larger of the two merged schools, argued for keeping the UTPA nickname, Broncs, while UTB supporters wanted a nickname new to both merged schools. UTPA Alumnus Alex Del Barrio created a petition to "Say No To Vaqueros" that garnered over 11,000 signatures after the announcement was made. Several local city councils also passed resolutions in support of one option or the other. President Guy Bailey recommended a new nickname, Vaqueros, to The University of Texas System Board of Regents on November 5, 2014. The suggestion for Vaquero was inspired by the UTPA student Studio Art projects, where the Toro and Vaquero were the most popular projects.

Bailey also recommended school's athletic colors be UT System orange, green (formerly the secondary color of UTPA), and blue (formerly the secondary color of UTB).

The announcement to the decision generated a swift and mainly negative reaction from some UTPA supporters on social media. These supporters, displeased that the Bronc was being moved to the wayside, determined the name was culturally insensitive, racist, and sexist. Nevertheless, the UT System Board of Regents approved the recommendation the following day, making Vaqueros the fifth NCAA Division I nickname that is a Spanish language word after the Cal State Northridge Matadors, UC Santa Barbara Gauchos, San Diego Toreros, and New Mexico Lobos. Bailey considered the decision "final" following the approval by the board of regents.  About 500 students protested against the Vaquero mascot on the UTPA campus on 13 November 2014. A petition calling for Bailey's immediate resignation garnered more than 700 signatures. Articles of impeachment were filed against the Student Government President Alberto Adame and Vice-President Carla "Fernanda" Pena by Jonathan Lee Salinas (Senator at Large '14–'15) partly for their roles in the mascot committee, though, the impeachment process was ended due to insufficient evidence. Following the protests, the UT System issued a press release supporting the "Vaquero" decision.

At the height of the controversy in November 2014, Texas legislator Terry Canales suggested he was considering filing a bill requiring UTRGV to abandon the Vaquero nickname. Canales submitted HB901 in January 2015. If passed, the legislation would require UTRGV to hold a student election for the athletics nickname, with "Broncs" and "Ocelots" on the ballot.

The mascot design was revealed in February 2015. The logo features an orange faced rider in green on a navy blue and green horse. The logo features an outline of Texas in the negative space between the legs of the horse.

In June 2019 the new design for The Vaquero Mascot was revealed. The new costumed version of the mascot was voted on and created by UTRGV students.

Notable alumni (including UTPA and UTB/TSC)

 Pablo Almaguer: Chair of the State Bar of Texas Board of Directors
 Gloria Anzaldúa: Novelist, Educator, Cultural Theorist
 Jose Luis Betancourt, Jr.: Retired Rear Admiral of the United States Navy
 Mike Brisky: Former member of the PGA.
 Minerva G. Carcaño: Bishop
 Oscar Cásares, writer
 Mire Chatman: Euro Basketball player
 Kika de la Garza: Former U.S. Congressman
 Dan Firova: Former MLB baseball player and current Mexican League Manager.
 William Garrison: Retired Major General of the United States Army
 Apple Green: Retired NBA player
 Greg Guy: Former NCAA basketball scoring champion
 Jim Hickey: MLB Pitching Coach
 Juan "Chuy" Hinojosa: Texas State Senator
 Perry Hill: MLB Assistant Coach
 Rubén Hinojosa: U.S. Congressman
 Lucious Jackson: Olympic Gold Medalist and NBA player
 Rossy Evelin Lima: Poet
 Eddie Lucio: Texas State Senator
 Glenn Martinez: Dean, College of Liberal and Fine Arts, University of Texas San Antonio
 Otto Moore: Retired NBA Player
 Javier Palomárez: President & CEO, United States Hispanic Chamber of Commerce
 Marshall Rogers: Former NCAA Basketball Scoring Champion
 Rogelio Sáenz: Dean, College of Public Policy, University of Texas San Antonio
Paul Michael Stoll (born 1985): American-Mexican basketball player
 Fred Taylor: Retired NBA Player
 Jim Tyrone: Retired MLB Player and Member of UTPA College World Series Team
 Wayne Tyrone: Retired MLB Player and Member of UTPA College World Series Team
 George Williams: Retired MLB Catcher
 Jaime Zapata, U.S. Homeland Security special agent
 Valente Rodriguez: American Actor

References

Notes

External links

 
 UTRGV Athletics website

 
Public universities and colleges in Texas
Rio Grande Valley
Education in Brownsville, Texas
Education in Edinburg, Texas
Education in Harlingen, Texas
Buildings and structures in Brownsville, Texas
Buildings and structures in Edinburg, Texas
Buildings and structures in Harlingen, Texas
2015 establishments in Texas
Educational institutions established in 2015
Universities and colleges formed by merger in the United States